This is a list of episodes of the seventh season of The Ellen DeGeneres Show,
which aired from September 2009 to June 2010.

Episodes

References

External links
 

7
2009 American television seasons
2010 American television seasons